The Clark Adams Building, also known as the Bankers Building, is a skyscraper located at 105 West Adams Street in Chicago, Illinois. The building was designed by the Burnham Brothers who designed other buildings in Chicago such as the Carbide and Carbon Building. The building stands at 476 feet tall and has 41 floors. Construction of the Clark Adams Building began in 1926 and was completed in 1927.

Owners
As of 2006, Musa Philip Tadros Of Crown Commercial Real Estate and Development had purchased the building.

Tenants
One quarter of the Clark Adams Building is leased to Club Quarters, while retail tenants include Native Foods, Elephant & Castle restaurants and Starbucks.

References

Office buildings completed in 1927
Residential skyscrapers in Chicago
Skyscraper office buildings in Chicago
1927 establishments in Illinois